Ghatlodiya is an area in Ahmedabad in the state of Gujarat, in western India.

Demographics
 India census, It is fast developed neighbourhood in Gujarat. Ghatlodiya had a population of 106,259. Males constitute 53% of the population and females 47%. Ghatlodiya has an average literacy rate of 83%, higher than the national average of 59.5%: male literacy is 85%, and female literacy is 80%. In Ghatlodiya, 10% of the population is under 6 years of age.

It is a residential cum commercial area in Ahmedabad City. It is a very good locality and well connected with the other areas of Ahmedabad city. It is well connected by trains, buses and public transports.  School, bank, ATM and hospital are available nearby the locality.

The major localities in Ghatlodia are Prabhat Chowk, KK Nagar, Sayona City, Ghatlodia Village, Chanakyapuri and so on. Ghatlodia also has a significant Patel population. Most Patel Families live in the KK Nagar (Also known as Patidar Chowk) and Rabari families in Chanakyapuri and are nearer to Ghatlodia Village.

Education
Schools in Ghatlodia are either public schools (run by the Governments) or private schools (run by trusts or individuals), which in some cases receive financial aid from the government. The schools are affiliated either with the Gujarat Education Central Board (GESB), the All-India Council for the Indian School Certificate Examinations (CISCE), National Institute of Open Schooling (NIOS) or the Central Board for Secondary Education (CBSE) boards.  Gujarati or English is the usual language of instruction.

References

Neighbourhoods in Ahmedabad